El Cajon Dam may refer to:
 El Cajón Dam (Argentina)
 El Cajón Dam (Honduras)
 El Cajón Dam (Mexico)